USS Yellowstone (AD 27) was a  named for Yellowstone National Park, the second United States Navy vessel to bear the name.

Yellowstone laid down on 16 October 1944 at Tacoma, Washington by the Seattle Division of the Todd-Pacific Shipyards, Inc.; launched on 12 April 1945; sponsored by Mrs. F. A. Zeusler, the wife of Capt. F. A. Zeusler, USCG, the District Coast Guard Officer of the 13th Naval District; and commissioned on 16 January 1946.

Service history
After shakedown training out of San Diego and repairs at Puget Sound Naval Shipyard to correct minor deficiencies which appeared during her initial cruise, Yellowstone operated in the Seattle, Washington area into March 1946. She departed Seattle on the last day of the month, transited the Panama Canal on 11 April, and arrived at Newport, Rhode Island on the 20th to take up her duties tending destroyers of the Atlantic Fleet. Yellowstone performed faithful service to the Fleet for the next 28 years, providing repair, supply, and auxiliary services (i.e., power and fresh water) not only to destroyers (the purpose for which she was designed) but also to aircraft carriers and submarines. In time, this valuable adjunct to the fleet earned a reputation for reliability and dependability that caused some to nickname her "Old Faithful," after the famous geyser in Yellowstone National Park. The destroyer tender also earned the coveted battle efficiency "E" award 10 times.
 
Yellowstone was deployed to the Mediterranean Sea 11 times between 1947 and 1968. Her ports of operation ranged from İzmir, Turkey to Naples, Italy; from Venice to Taranto; from Souda Bay on the Island of Crete to Gibraltar; and included cities in Spain, France, Italy, and Greece. In between her deployments with the 6th Fleet, the destroyer tender operated out of Boston, Newport, Norfolk, Bermuda, Mayport, Florida.
 
Her tasks were performed mostly unheralded and far from the public eye but were necessary to maintain the ships of the Fleet in operational trim. Working against the destroyer's deadline, Yellowstones skilled artisans accomplished the task in only 12 days and thus allowed her to get underway on time. Soon thereafter, Yellowstone deployed to the Mediterranean for the 12th and last time. She arrived at Naples on 9 December 1969 and, before long, found herself with another difficult, major repair task ahead of her. Repair, supply, and deck divisions of both ships participated in the evolution that earned Yellowstone a commendation.

A little more than a month later, the tender's talent was once again subjected to a rigorous test. On 10 February 1970 at Naples, the Greek registry freighter Mautric collided with Yellowstone and the tender's nest of destroyers. Capt. R. D. Wood, commanding Yellowstone, and Senior Chief Ship Fitter William S. Burman received Navy commendation medals for heading the exemplary repair work that soon had all ships back in operational condition.

The repair ship sailed for home in mid-May and arrived at Mayport, Florida on 1 June. One month later, on 1 July, the ship's home port was changed from Mayport to Charleston, South Carolina. The destroyer tender provided services to ships of Cruiser-Destroyer Flotilla (CruDesFlot) 6 into January 1971. At the end of that month, she sailed for Puerto Rico and took part in "Springboard" exercises before returning to Charleston on 16 February. In that role, he coordinated local pier assignments; arranged for tug and tow services; made military guard ship and pier sentry assignments; scheduled ship tours; provided information and assistance to dependents; and represented the destroyer force at meetings of numerous naval station, base, and district advisory boards and committees.
 
Yellowstone remained in port at Charleston into 1973. Among the noteworthy events that occurred that year was the ship's nomination to receive the Ney Award, recognizing the ship's outstanding food service mess, as the nominee of the commander, Cruiser Destroyer Force, Atlantic Fleet. In 1974 the ship's boilers were converted to use Navy distillate fuel. After 28 years of continuous service to the Fleet (the last few years of which were spent along the eastern seaboard of the United States) Yellowstone was decommissioned on 11 September 1974. Struck from the Naval Vessel Register the next day and subsequently transferred to the Maritime Administration for disposal, the veteran auxiliary was sold for scrapping in September 1975.

References

External links
 USS Yellowstone (AD27) Reunion Web Site
 USS Yellowstone Homepage

 

Shenandoah-class destroyer tenders
1945 ships
Tenders of the United States Navy
Destroyer tenders of the United States